Harry Oskar Triguboff  (born 3 March 1933) is an Australian billionaire real estate developer, and one of Australia's richest people. He is the founder and managing director of Meriton and is known as "high-rise Harry".

, The Australian Financial Review assessed Triguboff as the sixth richest Australian by net worth, estimated at 17.27 billion, as published in the 2021 Rich List. In May 2016, Triguboff's net worth was assessed at 11.62 billion in the 2016 Rich List, making him the richest Australian; yet held the mantle for only one year. In 2021, Forbes estimated his net worth at 11.3 billion.

Early life and education 
Triguboff was born on 3 March 1933 in Dalian (Darien at the time), Liaoning, Republic of China. He was the son of Russian Jewish parents, Moshe and Frida. His father moved to China in 1916 to escape antisemitism in the Russian Empire.

Triguboff grew up in the Jewish community in Tianjin, in the British and American concessions. His father established a store that traded wool, silk and leather. In 1937, during the Second Sino-Japanese War, the Imperial Japanese Army invaded the city. The foreign concessions were initially left untouched, but following the invasion of Pearl Harbor in 1941 the British and American residents were placed into internment camps. The Russian residents subsequently "seized the opportunity to take over trade in and out of China". Triguboff's father opened four more stores and acquired 20 apartments, as well as a summer residence in Beidaihe. He helped distribute the textiles that had been seized by the Japanese to buyers in northern China. In 1946, after the war's end, he was convicted of collaboration with the Japanese for allegedly selling leather goods and scrap metal to the Japanese government. However, the following year he was acquitted on appeal to the Supreme Court of the Republic of China.

In 1946, Triguboff's family obtained landing permits for Australia, after being refused visas to Canada and the United States. He and his brother were sent to Sydney in 1948, but the Australian government attempted to exclude them from the country over concerns about their father's war-time activities. Osmond Charles Fuhrman, the Australian consul in Shanghai at the time, estimated that their father had a net worth of up to US$4 million. Triguboff was ultimately allowed into the country and was educated at the Scots College in Sydney. He later graduated with a degree in textiles from the University of Leeds in England, before working in textile businesses in Israel and South Africa.

He returned to Australia in 1950 and became an Australian citizen in 1961. He did a variety of odd jobs, including running a taxi fleet and owning a milk round in Chatswood. He tried selling real estate and worked as an assistant to a lecturer at university but wasn't so successful at either. He then bought some land in Roseville and hired a builder to begin building his house. The builder repeatedly let him down, so Triguboff threw him out and finished the job himself, learning from his mistakes.

Career

From the experience gained in his  initial development, Triguboff bought his second block of land in 1963, this time in Smith Street, Tempe, and began building a block of eight units with a partner. He made a profit, which led to a second development in 1968 in Gladesville. At Meriton Street, Triguboff built a block of 18 units which provided the name of the company he registered in developers.

Triguboff is the managing director of Meriton Apartments Pty Ltd.  Meriton had built more than 55,000 residential townhouses and apartments since its creation in 1963, making it Australia's biggest residential property developer. In 2010, Meriton was said to develop an average of 1,000 apartments per year. , the average exceeds 3,000 per annum. In particular, Triguboff has concentrated on the Gold Coast and Brisbane in Queensland, and Sydney's central business district, building more apartments than any other Australian residential developer. He is a proponent that the population of Australia should grow to reach 100 million.

In 2004, Meriton completed the construction of World Tower, Sydney's tallest residential apartment building. During 2012, Meriton and the owners' corporation became embroiled in a long running court dispute over major building defects and alleged breaches of their contract, with maintenance issues worth more than A$1 million. Part of the issue related to Meriton, the original builder, being locked out of the development. By 2015, He had built approximately 55,000 residential townhouses and apartments.

The company has been a sponsor of the Wests Tigers (and their predecessor, Balmain Tigers) since 1998. Triguboff committed Meriton throughout the club's merger period of 2000 and into 2015.

Triguboff donates heavily to political parties and uses his influence to seek policy changes. In August 2010, he proposed that the federal government should insist on Reserve Bank interest rates being dropped to improve housing affordability.

Personal life
Triguboff is Jewish. He has been married twice and has two daughters from his first marriage, Orna and Sharon. He is married to his second wife, Rhonda. He lives in Sydney and owns a collection of cars.

Net worth
According to the 2017 Financial Review Rich List, Triguboff's personal net wealth was estimated at 11.40 billion, an increase of $0.78 billion on the previous year. Meanwhile, Forbes Asia estimated his wealth in 2015 at 5.6 billion. In 2015, Forbes Asia magazine's annual billionaires list assessed Triguboff as the world's 262 wealthiest billionaire. His earnings result from leasing most of his developments to short and long term tenants, with benefits from capital appreciation. , Triguboff was one of ten Australians who have appeared in every Financial Review Rich List, or its predecessor, the BRW Rich 200, since it was first published in 1984.

Triguboff participated in a 2010 Business Review Weekly magazine contest to "Win a Week With a Billionaire". Three young finalists were flown to Sydney where they spent a week at Meriton being mentored by Triguboff.

Honours
Triguboff was appointed a Member of the Order of Australia on 26 January 1990 "for service to building and construction and for philanthropy" and an Officer of the Order on 7 June 1999 "for service to the community as a philanthropist, and to the residential construction industry".

Triguboff was the first person to win Australia's Property Person of the Year award twice; he first won the award in 2003 and then again in 2009.

Philanthropy

Triguboff, via The Harry Triguboff Foundation, funded a project at the Shorashim Center to assist immigrant applicants to Israel in proving their Jewishness.

References

External links

Meriton Apartments website
Meriton Serviced Apartments website

Australian Jews
Australian people of Russian-Jewish descent
1933 births
Living people
Alumni of the University of Leeds
Australian billionaires
Chinese emigrants to Australia
People educated at Scots College (Sydney)
Businesspeople from Dalian
Officers of the Order of Australia
Businesspeople from Sydney